Tepidimonas taiwanensis is a Gram-negative, motile bacterium with a single polar flagellum from the genus Tepidimonas, which was isolated from a hot spring in the Pingtung area in southern Taiwan.

References

Comamonadaceae
Bacteria described in 2006